Mindy Weisel is an American abstract visual artist and author.

Early life and education
Weisel was born in Bergen-Belsen, Germany. Her parents were survivors of the Auschwitz concentration camp.

Weisel began to paint when she was 14 years old. She attended California State University from 1965 to 1974 and the Otis Art Institute in 1971. She obtained her Bachelor of Fine Arts degree at George Washington University in 1977 and performed post graduate studies at the American University.

Career
Weisel has had numerous solo and group exhibitions in both Germany and the U.S. including a 2013 show at the Kreeger Museum in Washington DC. Her work is permanently displayed at several American museums including the Smithsonian Institution's National Museum of American Art, Baltimore Museum of Art and the Hirshhorn Museum. Her work can also be seen at the United States Embassy in Berlin, Germany and the Israel Museum in Jerusalem.  She is the author of several books including Touching Quiet: Reflections in Solitude.  Weisel is the editor of the Holocaust survivor book, Daughters of Absence.

Selected solo exhibitions 
2017                          Mediations of Love, Rosenbach Contemporary, Israel

2014–2018                Crossover: Glass Installation, Eretz Israel Museum, Tel Aviv

2013                          Not Neutral, Lorch & Seidel Galerie, Berlin, Germany

2013                          NOT NEUTRAL, Kreeger Museum, Washington, DC

2011                          Visiting Artist Exhibition, Gensler Architects, Washington, DC

2010                          AFTER: The Survival of Beauty, Jean Albano Gallery, Chicago, IL

2009                          Full Circle, Lorch & Seidel Galerie, Berlin, Germany

2008                          Of Roses and Rasa, Prada Gallery, Washington, DC

2006                          Words on a Journey, Katzen Arts Center, American University, Washington, DC

2005                          Out of the Blue, Reed Savage Gallery, Miami, FL

Cover to Cover, Maryland Federation of Art, Annapolis, MD

2004                          All That is Remembered, Jean Albano Gallery, Chicago, IL

25 Years of Painting, Strand on Volta Gallery, Washington, DC

2003                          Nine Anniversaries of Blue, Jean Albano Gallery, Chicago, IL

2002                         Translations, Troyer Gallery, Washington, DC

Tikkun Ha'Olam: Meditations in Blue, Yale University, New Haven, CT

Beauty as Consolation, Yale University School of Medicine, New Haven, CT

2001                          Ella the Muse, Lydon Fine Arts, Chicago, IL

1999–2000               Mindy Weisel, 1979–1999, Lydon Fine Arts, Chicago, IL

1999                          In the Presence of Absence, Troyer Gallery, Washington, DC

1997                          A Place for Memory, Troyer Fitzpatrick Lassman, Washington, DC

1995                          Lili, Let's Dance, Troyer Fitzpatrick Lassman, Washington, DC

1993                          Touching Quiet, Jones Troyer Fitzpatrick, Washington, DC

1992                          A Harmony of Sorts, Jones Troyer Fitzpatrick, Washington, DC

1990                          Night of the Soul, Daniel Broder Gallery, New York

1989                          Echoes, Jones Troyer Fitzpatrick, Washington, DC

1986                          Selected Paintings, Baumgartner Gallery, Washington, DC

1985                          Passions and Appearances, Bertha Urdang Gallery, New York, NY

Gypsy, Baumgartner Gallery, Washington, DC

Layers of Time, Elise Meyer, New York

1984                          Black Gifts, Baumgartner Gallery, Washington, DC

1983                          Transitions: Paintings from 1979-1983, B'nai Brith Museum, Washington, DC

1982                          Lili in Blue, Jack Rasmussen Gallery, Washington, DC

1981                          Recent Paintings, Jack Rasmussen Gallery, Washington, DC

1980                          Paintings of the Holocaust, Jack Rasmussen Gallery, Washington, DC

1977                          Works on Paper, Diane Brown Gallery, Washington, DC

Awards and national commissions 
2012                          Gottesman Etching Center, Kibbutz Cabri, Israel

2008                          Painting Fellowship, Virginia Center for the Creative Arts, Sweet Briar, VA

2004                          Fellowship, Virginia Center for the Creative Arts, Sweet Briar, VA

2001–present          Smithsonian: Archives of American Artists

1997–98                    NASA Art Program Commission, Celebrating Women in Space

1995–present          Art in Embassies Program, State Department, Washington, DC

1999–present          Member, Women's Forum of Washington, Washington, DC

1996–98                    Board of Directors, Washington Area Lawyers for the Arts, Washington, DC

1993                          Fellowship, Mishkenot Sha'ananim, Jerusalem, Israel

1992                          Fellowship, Virginia Center for the Creative Arts, Sweet Briar, VA

1991                          Commission, Smithsonian Resident Associates Program, Serigraph Flowers for a Country

1998                          Artist-in-Residence, Haifa University, Haifa, Israel

Commission, International Human Rights Law Group

1987                          Nomination, Award in the Visual Arts

Commission, Amnesty International Poster

Commission, Washington Area Lawyers for the Arts, Original Limited Edition Silkscreen

1986                          Rutgers National Works on Paper Award, Stedman Art Gallery

Personal life
Weisel is married and has three daughters. She practices Transcendental Meditation.

References

External links
Official website

Living people
20th-century American painters
20th-century American women artists
20th-century American women writers
21st-century American painters
21st-century American women artists
21st-century American women writers
American University alumni
American women painters
Artist authors
George Washington University alumni
German emigrants to the United States
Year of birth missing (living people)
Artists from Washington, D.C.
Painters from Washington, D.C.